Brigadier G. R. Jayasinghe, VSV was a Sri Lankan military officer, who was the former head of the Sri Lanka Army Ordnance Corps and founder of the Sri Lanka Rifle Corps in 1984.

Educated at Royal College, Colombo, he joined the army after leaving school.  He was commissioned into the Ceylon Army Ordnance Corps as a Second Lieutenant. He served as the Commanding officer of the Sri Lanka Army Ordnance Corps from 1966 to 1969 and from 1969 to 1974.

References

Alumni of Royal College, Colombo
Living people
Sri Lanka Military Academy graduates
Sinhalese military personnel
Year of birth missing (living people)
Sri Lanka Army Ordnance Corps officers
Sri Lankan brigadiers